The following lists events that happened during 1945 in New Zealand.

Population
A census was held on 25 September 1945.

 Estimated population as of 31 December: 1,727,800
 Increase since previous 31 December 1944: 51,500 (3.07%)
 Males per 100 females: 98.1
 Large increase is due to demobilisation of New Zealanders from military service overseas.

Incumbents

Regal and viceregal
Head of State – George VI
Governor-General – Marshal of the Royal Air Force Sir Cyril Newall GCB OM GCMG CBE AM

Government
The 27th New Zealand Parliament continued, with the Labour Party in government.
Speaker of the House – Bill Schramm (Labour)
Prime Minister – Peter Fraser
Minister of Finance – Walter Nash
Minister of Foreign Affairs – Peter Fraser
Attorney-General – Rex Mason
Chief Justice – Sir Michael Myers

Parliamentary opposition 
 Leader of the Opposition –  Sidney Holland (National Party).

Main centre leaders
Mayor of Auckland – John Allum
Mayor of Hamilton – Harold Caro
Mayor of Wellington – Will Appleton
Mayor of Christchurch – Ernest Andrews
Mayor of Dunedin – Donald Cameron

Events 

 2 May: New Zealand 2nd Division accepts surrender of the German Army in Trieste.
15 December: Main North Line railway linking Christchurch and Picton is completed and officially opened over seventy years after construction began.
 Saturday and Sunday trading by most retail outlets, apart from dairies and takeaway food outlets, is banned.

Arts and literature

See 1945 in art, 1945 in literature

Music

See: 1945 in music

Radio

See: Public broadcasting in New Zealand

Film

See: :Category:1945 film awards, 1945 in film, List of New Zealand feature films, Cinema of New Zealand, :Category:1945 films

Sport

Archery
National Champions (Postal Shoot)
Open: W. Burton (Gisborne)
Women: P. Bryan (Auckland)

Athletics
 Lionel Fox wins his first national title in the men's marathon, clocking 2:54:09.2 in Wellington.

Chess
 The 52nd National Chess Championship was held in Auckland, and was won by R.G. Wade of Wellington (his 2nd win).

Cricket

Horse racing

Harness racing
 New Zealand Trotting Cup – Gold Bar
 Auckland Trotting Cup – Sea Born

Lawn bowls
The national outdoor lawn bowls championships are held in Auckland.
 Men's singles champion – J.S. Martin (Carlton Bowling Club)
 Men's pair champions – J.W. Darroch, L. Russell (skip) (Auckland Bowling Club)
 Men's fours champions – J. Franklin, H. Berry, J.A. Maher, Arthur Engebretsen (skip) (Heretaunga Bowling Club)

Rugby union
:Category:Rugby union in New Zealand, :Category:All Blacks
 Ranfurly Shield

Rugby league
New Zealand national rugby league team

Soccer
 The Chatham Cup is won by Western of Christchurch who beat Wellington Marist 4–3 in the final.
 Provincial league champions:
	Auckland:	Philomel
	Canterbury:	Western
	Hawke's Bay:	Napier HSOB
	Nelson:	RNZAF
	Otago:	Mosgiel
	South Canterbury:	No competition
	Southland:	No competition
	Taranaki:	Old Boys
	Waikato:	Rotowaro
	Wanganui:	No competition
	Wellington:	Wellington Marist

Births
 17 January: Jeanette Fitzsimons, politician and environmentalist (d. 2020).
 30 January: Eion Edgar, businessman, sports administrator, and philanthropist (d. 2021).
 5 February: Michael Cullen, politician (d. 2021).
 21 February: Jim McLay, politician.
 4 April: Bryan Andrews, cricketer.
 11 April: David McPhail, comedian, actor, writer (d. 2021).
 11 April: Winston Peters, politician.
 5 September: Conal Coad, opera singer.
 7 September: Vic Pollard, cricketer.
 10 October: Moana Jackson, lawyer (d. 2022).
 19 September Bill Jeffries, politician.
 15 November: Roger Donaldson, film director.
 15 December: Michael King, historian (d. 2004).

Deaths
 February: David Russell, soldier awarded the George Cross.
 10 March: Edith Joan Lyttleton, writer.
 15 April: Raffaello Squarise, Italian violinist
 6 June: Ewen Alison, politician.
 24 August Michael Reardon, political activist
 11 December: Albert Moss, cricketer.

See also
History of New Zealand
List of years in New Zealand
Military history of New Zealand
Timeline of New Zealand history
Timeline of New Zealand's links with Antarctica
Timeline of the New Zealand environment

For world events and topics in 1945 not specifically related to New Zealand see: 1945

References

External links

 
Years of the 20th century in New Zealand